Michael Genet (born August 25, 1958) is an American actor and screenwriter. He has guest starred in a number of television series based in the New York City area, they include The Equalizer, New York Undercover, Law & Order, Law & Order: Criminal Intent, Law & Order: Special Victims Unit, Ugly Betty and the soap operas As the World Turns, One Life to Live.

As a screenwriter, Genet wrote the film She Hate Me (2004), directed by Spike Lee, co-writing the film with Lee. Genet also appeared in the film playing the older brother of the film's protagonist, played by Anthony Mackie. Prior to this, he appeared in Lee's 2002 film 25th Hour. The next film he wrote Talk to Me (2007), was directed by Kasi Lemmons, co-writing the film with Rick Famuyiwa.

Genet has also appeared in a number of Broadway stage productions.

Filmography

References

External links

1958 births
20th-century American male actors
21st-century American male actors
Male actors from New York City
Male actors from Washington (state)
African-American male actors
African-American screenwriters
Screenwriters from New York (state)
American male film actors
American male stage actors
American male television actors
Living people
20th-century African-American people
21st-century African-American people